Sphaeromias bifidus is a species of biting midges, and are insects in the family Ceratopogonidae.

References

Further reading

 
 

Ceratopogonidae
Articles created by Qbugbot
Insects described in 1979